Letzel is a surname. Notable people with the surname include:

 Jan Letzel (1880–1925), Czech architect
 Heio Letzel, German filmmaker

See also
 6266 Letzel, main-belt asteroid discovered on 1986

References

German-language surnames